This is a list of Southern League, FA Cup and Test Match appearances made, and goals scored, by Thames Ironworks F.C. players from 1895 until 1900.  This list does not include London League, friendly or reserve statistics.''

Player records

Record victories

Southern League Division One:
Home: 4–0 v Chatham, 18 September 1899
Away: 3–0 v Sheppey United, 20 January 1900

Southern League Division Two:
Home: 10–0 Maidenhead, 15 April 1899
Away: 4–0 Maidenhead F.C., 31 December 1898

London League:
Home: 7–3 v Bromley, 15 January 1898
Away: 5–1 v Bromley F.C., 19 March 1898

FA Cup:
Home: 6–1 v Royal Engineers, 23 September 1899
Away: 7–0 v Dartford, 28 October 1899

Friendly:
Home: 7–1 v Lewisham St. Marys F.C., 28 December 1895
Away: 8–0 v Manor Park F.C., 28 September 1895

Top appearance makers
Most Appearances:
Tommy Moore (61) 1898–1900

Most Appearances in a Season:
Roddy McEachrane (36) 1899–1900
Kenny McKay (36) 1899–1900

Most FA Cup Appearances:
Charlie Dove (10) 1895–1900
Tommy Moore (10) 1898–1900

Top goalscorers
Top Scorer in a Season:
Bill Joyce (18) 1899–1900

Top League Scorer in a Season:
David Lloyd (12) Southern League Division Two 1898–99

Most Goals in One Match:
Henderson (4) v Uxbridge F.C. (h) 18 February 1899
Patrick Leonard (4) v Maidenhead (h) 15 April 1899

References

Thames Ironworks F.C. records and statistics
Thames Ironworks